Joel Isai Alvarado, professionally known as Isai (pronounced "Isaiah"), is an American Super Smash Bros. 64 player widely regarded as the game's greatest player of all time. He is credited with developing the modern Smash 64 metagame  and is renowned for his ability to play the game's entire character roster at a top professional level. His major tournament victories include Apex 2014.

Alvarado also formerly competed in Super Smash Bros. Melee, where he was regarded as one of the best players in the world and the world's best Captain Falcon player during the early years of the game's competitive scene in the early to mid-2000s. He was regarded as one of the best Melee team players in the world, often teaming with his partner Ken Hoang under the name "El Chocolate Diablo". The team was renowned for its dominance and won the Major League Gaming Las Vegas 2006 Melee doubles championship. Alvarado retired from professional Melee competition in 2007, citing declining interest in the game, however he later teamed with Johnny "S2J" Kim at GENESIS 2 in 2011 and played an exhibition match against Ryota "Captain Jack" Yoshida at Apex 2012, which he infamously lost after sandbagging.  A 2021 list compiled by PGstats ranked Isai as the fifteenth-greatest Melee player of all time.

Alvarado was formerly sponsored by CLASH Tournaments, and occasionally streamed on the CLASH Tournaments channel.

Career
Isai is predominantly a Super Smash Bros. player. He became acquainted with the community surrounding its sequel, Super Smash Bros. Melee, entering his first tournament, Tournament Go 4 (TG4), on January 19, 2003. He teamed up with the top-ranked player, Ken Hoang, in Tournament Go's fifth incarnation, TG5, for doubles events and continued to team with Ken in later tournaments beginning an undefeated streak that lasted from 2003 to 2006.

Isai is known for not taking Melee singles events seriously. He retired from playing the game competitively in 2007, and later shifted his focus back to Super Smash Bros. for Nintendo 64.

He is the Super Smash Bros, champion of Apex 2014, defeating Moyashi in the grand finals using Jigglypuff, a character considered to be worse than some of the higher-tiered characters such as Pikachu and Kirby.

Personal life
Isai is a graduate of San José State University and was the president of the school's chapter of Beta Alpha Psi.

Notable tournament placements
Only Majors and Supermajors are listed.

Super Smash Bros.

Super Smash Bros. Melee

References

American esports players
Living people
Super Smash Bros. 64 players
San Jose State University alumni
Super Smash Bros. Melee players
Year of birth missing (living people)